Toffolo is a surname. Notable people with the surname include:

Davide Toffolo (born 1965), Italian comic books writer
Didier Toffolo (born 1959), French football player and manager
Georgia Toffolo (born 1994)  British television personality
Harry Toffolo (born 1995), English football player
Lino Toffolo (1934-2016), Italian actor and singer
Rael Toffolo (born 1976), Brazilian musician